Jimmie Hackley (born September 11, 1975) is an American sprinter who specializes in the 200 metres.

He finished fifth at the 2004 World Indoor Championships. He became US Indoor champion in 2004.

His personal best times were 20.31 seconds in the 200 meters, achieved in April 2004 in Fort-de-France; 10.33 seconds in the 100 meters, achieved in May 2004 in Kingston, Jamaica and in April 2005 in Tallahassee; and 45.17 seconds in the 400 meters, achieved in April 1998 in Gainesville.

References

1975 births
Living people
American male sprinters